Al-Sharq Club of Dilam is a Saudi Arabian football (soccer) team in Dilam, south of Riyadh, playing at the Saudi Second Division.

Current squad 
As of Saudi Second Division:

References

Football clubs in Saudi Arabia
Football clubs in Ad-Dilam
Association football clubs established in 1962
1962 establishments in Saudi Arabia